Chiniofon is an antiprotozoal agent.

References

Further reading 

 

Sulfonic acids
Quinolinols
Iodoarenes
Antiprotozoal agents